Bruno Ernesto Guarda (born February 6, 1986, Piracicaba), also known as Peter Jackson and DJ - BG is a Brazilian footballer who last played for the Dallas Sidekicks in the Major Arena Soccer League.

Career

College
Guarda moved to the United States in high school, and attended The Oakridge School in Arlington, Texas, before playing college soccer for Southern Methodist University, where he was named to the NSCAA All-Midwest Region first team in 2006, and was a Hermann Trophy semi-finalist and the Conference USA Player of the Year in both 2006 and 2007. During his college years Guarda also played for DFW Tornados in the USL Premier Development League, scoring 10 goals in 42 appearances for the team.

Professional
Guarda left college in his final year to concentrate on a professional soccer career. He was allocated to Colorado Rapids in a weighted lottery and signed a developmental contract with them. However, he was soon traded to FC Dallas (reuniting him with his former college coach Schellas Hyndman) in return for their 2009 MLS SuperDraft 2nd and 3rd round picks and allocation money.

Guarda joined FC Dallas on July 28, 2008 and made his professional debut on August 3, 2008, coming on as a substitute for Andre Rocha against Toronto FC. He scored his first goal for FC Dallas on September 21, 2008 in a 4-1 victory against the Chicago Fire. He played in every game after the trade, starting the final nine games of the 2008 regular season as an attacking midfielder.

Guarda graduated from the MLS Generation Adidas program at the end of the 2010 season.

Honours

FC Dallas
Major League Soccer Western Conference Championship (1): 2010

References

External links
 

1986 births
Living people
Brazilian footballers
Colorado Rapids players
Dallas Sidekicks (PASL/MASL) players
DFW Tornados players
FC Dallas players
SMU Mustangs men's soccer players
USL League Two players
Major League Soccer players
Brazilian expatriate footballers
Expatriate soccer players in the United States
Association football midfielders
Major Arena Soccer League players
Professional Arena Soccer League players
Soccer players from Texas
Sportspeople from Arlington, Texas
People from Piracicaba
Footballers from São Paulo (state)